Fairbourne railway station serves the village of Fairbourne in Gwynedd, Wales. It is an unstaffed station on the Cambrian Coast Railway with passenger services to Barmouth, Harlech, Porthmadog, Pwllheli, Tywyn, Aberdovey, Machynlleth and Shrewsbury.

The 12¼ inch gauge Fairbourne Railway has a separate station nearby from which narrow gauge trains run the 2 miles from Fairbourne to Barmouth Ferry (Penrhyn Point).

History
The station first opened on 3 July 1865 and closed on 3 June 1867, during which time it was named Barmouth Ferry. It reopened as Fairbourne on 6 June 1899.

Services
There is a two-hourly service between Pwllheli and Machynlleth, with certain services continuing to Birmingham International.

There are 5 trains per day between Pwllheli and Machynlleth on Sundays.

References

External links
 

Railway stations in Gwynedd
DfT Category F2 stations
Former Cambrian Railway stations
Railway stations in Great Britain opened in 1865
Railway stations in Great Britain closed in 1867
Railway stations in Great Britain opened in 1899
Railway stations served by Transport for Wales Rail
Arthog